Romani people in France, generally known in spoken French as gitans, tsiganes or manouches, are an ethnic group that originated in Northern India. The exact number of Romani people in France is unknown; estimates vary from 500,000 to 1,200,000.

Origin
The Romani people originated in Northern India, presumably from the northwestern Indian states Rajasthan and Punjab.

The linguistic evidence has indisputably shown that roots of Romani language lie in India: the language has grammatical characteristics of Indian languages and shares with them a large part of the basic lexicon, for example, body parts and daily routines.

More exactly, Romani shares the basic lexicon with Hindi and Punjabi. It shares many phonetic features with Marwari, while its grammar is closest to Bengali.

Genetic findings in 2012 suggest the Romani originated in northwestern India and migrated as a group. According to a genetic study in 2012, the ancestors of present scheduled tribes and scheduled caste populations of northern India, traditionally referred to collectively as the Ḍoma, are the likely ancestral populations of modern European Roma.

Population
In France the Romani people are typically classified into three groups:
 
 "Roms", who come from territories in eastern Europe
 "Manouches", also known as "Sinté" (in Germany and Holland: Sinti), who often have familial ties in Germany and Italy
 "Gitans", who trace their familial ties to Romani people in Spain

The term "Romanichel" is considered pejorative in France, and "Bohémien" is outdated. The French National Gendarmerie referred to them in an ethnic database by the acronym "MENS" ("Minorités Ethniques Non-Sédentarisées"), an administrative term meaning "Travelling Ethnic Minorities". However this usage is not widely used, since this ethnic database was secret as creating ethnic data is illegal in France.

The exact numbers of Romani people in France are not known, with estimates varying from 20,000 to 400,000. The French Romani rights group FNASAT reports that at least 12,000 Romani, who have immigrated from Romania and Bulgaria, live in unofficial urban camps throughout the country. French authorities often attempt to close down these encampments. In 2009, the government sent more than 10,000 Romani back to Romania and Bulgaria.

In 2009, the European Committee of Social Rights found France had violated the European Social Charter (rights to housing, right to protection against poverty and social exclusion, right of the family to protection) in respect to Romani population from foreign countries.

Repatriations

In 2010 and 2011, the French government organized repatriation flights to send French Romani to Romania. On 12 April, a chartered flight carrying 160 Romani left northern France for Timișoara. As in the 2010 deportations, the French government gave those Romani leaving France €300 each, with €100 for each child. The Romani on the 12 April flight were forced to sign declarations that they would never return to France.

On 9 August, the city of Marseille in southern France forcibly evicted 100 Romani people from a makeshift camp near Porte d'Aix, giving them 24 hours to leave. A chartered flight carrying approximately 150 Romani to Romania left the Lyon area on 20 September. France's goal for 2011 was to deport 30,000 Romani to Romania. As of 2012, France sent about 8,000 Romani to Romania and Bulgaria in 2011, after dismantling camps where they were living on the outskirts of cities. The actions prompted controversy and calls for greater inclusion of Romani people.

Racism
Prejudiced views of Romani are widespread in France, with a 2014 Pew Research poll indicating that two-thirds of French people have unfavorable views of Romani. in 2016, more than 10,000 Roma were evicted by French authorities. According to a report published by the Human Rights League of France and the European Roma Rights Centre, 60 percent of all Romani living in France were forcibly evicted from their homes in 2016, many in cold winter months.

Rumors and fake news stories of a white van occupied by Romani attempting to abduct children or young women have spread across the French internet on multiple occasions. A number of violent incidents against Romani occurred in March 2019 after rumors of Romani kidnapping children spread on Facebook and Snapchat. Two people in a white van were attacked by 20 youths in Colombes on 16 March. On 25 March, 50 people attacked a Roma camp in Bobigny with sticks and knives, burning several vans, and a separate group of Romani were chased and attacked in Clichy-sous-Bois. Similar incidents occurred in Aubervilliers, Bondy and Noisy-le-Sec.

Notable individuals

See also
 Cascarots, a group of Romani in the Basque Country
 Erromintxela, a group of Romani in the Basque Country with their own language
 Gypsy jazz#France

References

External links 
 

 
France
Ethnic groups in France